Isufu "Ike" Quartey (born 27 November 1969) is a Ghanaian former professional boxer who competed from 1988 to 2006. He held the WBA welterweight title from 1994 to 1998, and challenged once for IBF junior-middleweight title in 2000.

Early years and amateur career
Quartey is a member of Accra's Ga tribe. He is the youngest of 27 children. His father reportedly had five wives. His older brother Isaac Quartey won a silver medal in the 1960 Olympics. He was born in Bukom where fighting was a hobby. He fought on the streets and trained in the same gym as Azumah Nelson.

Quartey had an amateur record of 50–4, and represented Ghana as a Light Welterweight at 1988 Seoul Olympic Games.

Professional career
Quartey turned professional in 1988, a day short of his nineteenth birthday. He started his boxing career under the guidance of Yoofi Boham, without doubt the most successful manager in Ghana, and also father-in-law of former World boxing champion Azumah Nelson.

Boham got Quartey recognized as a boxer on the international scene. Boham managed Quartey alongside Alfred "The Cobra" Kotey and gave them the names Bazooka and Cobra. Quartey and Kotey were so close that many thought they were brothers.

Quartey began his professional career with a 2nd-round knockout of Mama Mohamed. Most of Quartey's early fights were staged in Ghana, before he relocated to France.

WBA welterweight champion
In Quartey's 26th fight he was given a shot at the WBA welterweight title, held by the then undefeated Crisanto España of Venezuela. Quartey knocked out Espana in the 11th round. At the time of the stoppage one judge had Quartey ahead, one had him behind and a third judge had the fight even.

He defended his title successfully seven times. Among his foes were Alberto Cortes, Vince Phillips, and Oba Carr. In October 1997 he fought José Luis López to a draw. The decision was originally read as a win for Quartey but reversed when a flaw was found in the scoring. Although Quartey was down twice, most observers felt that he deserved the victory and his reputation suffered little damage.

Personal, business and health issues kept Quartey out of the ring until February 1999. His inactivity led him to be stripped of his WBA title.

Quartey vs. De La Hoya
Quartey returned from a 14-month absence to challenge Lineal/WBC welterweight champion Oscar De La Hoya at the Thomas & Mack center in Las Vegas, Nevada on 13 February 1999. Quartey was floored in 6th and 12th rounds, with De La Hoya also down in the 6th round. De La Hoya came away with a close, albeit controversial split decision. His interest in boxing waned after this defeat.

Quartey vs. Vargas
Following the defeat to De La Hoya, Quartey would take another 14-month hiatus from the ring. He returned in April 2000 to challenge Fernando Vargas for the IBF light-middleweight championship. Quartey was defeated by a unanimous decision with scores of 116-111 twice and 114–113.

Following this fight, Quartey would not fight for another five years.

Return to the ring
Quartey returned to the ring in January 2005. He won the first three bouts of his comeback with victories over Clint McNeil, Verno Phillips and Carlos Bojorquez. On 5 August 2006, he lost a close unanimous decision to former welterweight champion Vernon Forrest at Madison Square Garden, New York by scores of 93–96, 94–95, & 94–95. CompuBox stats showed Quartey outlanding Forrest (201 out of 481, 42% for Quartey; 184 of 818, 22% for Forrest), and Forrest was docked 1 point for a low blow in the 9th round. The decision was deemed controversial by most ringsider reporters, HBO's ringside commentators (including "unofficial scorer" Harold Lederman), and much of the crowd in attendance, who responded with a semi-raucous chorus of boos and repeated chants of "Bullshit!" after the fight. On 2 December 2006, Quartey's fought former undisputed light-middleweight champion Ronald "Winky" Wright at the St. Pete Times Forum, Tampa, Florida. Quartey was down once in the fight and went on to lose a unanimous points decision.

Boxing style
Quartey's best weapon was his jab, which was considered to be one of the best in boxing while he was in his prime. He primarily relied on a "peek-a-boo" or "clam-shell" defense, which consisted of him allowing punches to land on his arms, elbows and gloves which he kept held tightly to his cheeks and ribcage.

Professional boxing record

Pay-per-view bouts

References

External links

Ike Quartey profile at About.com

1969 births
Living people
Ga-Adangbe people
World welterweight boxing champions
Olympic boxers of Ghana
Boxers at the 1988 Summer Olympics
Ghanaian male boxers
African Boxing Union champions
World Boxing Association champions
Light-welterweight boxers
Light-middleweight boxers